K-117 Bryansk is a Russian Project 667BDRM Delfin-class (NATO reporting name: Delta IV) nuclear-powered ballistic missile submarine. The submarine was laid down in April 1985 in the Russian Northern Machinebuilding Enterprise, Sevmash. In September 1988 the submarine was commissioned in the Soviet navy. When launched the submarine became the 1000th Russian/Soviet submarine constructed. After the collapse of the Soviet Union the submarine continued to serve in the Russian navy. In July 2002 the submarine went into overhaul and didn't return until early 2008. As of 2010 the submarine is on active duty with the Russian Northern Fleet.

On 28 October 2010, the submarine conducted a successful SLBM launch.

Footnotes

Cold War submarines of the Soviet Union
Submarines of Russia
Ships of the Russian Northern Fleet
Delta-class submarines
1988 ships
Ships built by Sevmash

ru:Брянск (подводная лодка)